UFC Fight Night: Pavlovich vs. Blaydes (also known as UFC Fight Night 222  and UFC on ESPN+ 80) is an upcoming mixed martial arts event produced by the Ultimate Fighting Championship that will take place on April 22, 2023, at the UFC Apex facility in Enterprise, Nevada, part of the Las Vegas Metropolitan Area, United States.

Background
A heavyweight bout between Sergei Pavlovich and Curtis Blaydes is expected to headline the event.

A bantamweight bout between Danaa Batgerel and Brady Hiestand was scheduled for UFC Fight Night: Holloway vs. Allen a week earlier. However, the pair was moved to this event for undisclosed reasons.

A women's strawweight bout between Iasmin Lucindo and Melissa Martinez was expected to take place at the event. However, Martinez withdrew from the bout due to an undisclosed reason and was replaced by Brogan Walker-Sanchez.

Fight card

Announced bouts 
Women's Featherweight bout: Karol Rosa vs. Norma Dumont
Women's Strawweight bout: Iasmin Lucindo vs. Brogan Walker-Sanchez
Lightweight bout: Bobby Green vs. Jared Gordon
Featherweight bout: Francis Marshall vs. William Gomis
Women's Flyweight bout: Priscila Cachoeira vs. Karine Silva
Middleweight bout: Brad Tavares vs. Bruno Silva
Lightweight bout: Christos Giagos vs. Ricky Glenn
Bantamweight bout: Danaa Batgerel vs. Brady Hiestand
Flyweight bout: Carlos Candelario vs. Rafael Estevam
Bantamweight bout: Montel Jackson vs. Rani Yahya
Welterweight bout: Jeremiah Wells vs. Matthew Semelsberger

See also 

 List of UFC events
 List of current UFC fighters
 2023 in UFC

References 

 

UFC Fight Night
2023 in mixed martial arts
Scheduled mixed martial arts events
2023 in sports in Nevada
April 2023 sports events in the United States